William Ford Nichols (June 9, 1849 – June 5, 1924) was the second Bishop of California in The Episcopal Church.

Early Life and Education
William Ford Nichols was born in Lloyd, New York on June 9, 1849 to Charles Hubert Nichols and Margaret Emilia Grant. He studied at Trinity College and graduated with a Bachelor of Arts in 1870. He then graduated from Berkeley Divinity School in 1873 with a Bachelor of Divinity, and a Master of Arts from Kenyon College in 1888.

Ordained Ministry
Nichols served as private secretary to Bishop John Williams of Connecticut between 1871 and 1876. He was ordained deacon on June 4, 1873 and priest on June 4, 1874 at Holy Trinity Church. He was initially assistant at Holy Trinity Church in Middletown, Connecticut from 1873 until 1875. In 1875 he became rector of St James’ Church in West Hartford, Connecticut and Grace Church in Newington, Connecticut, while in 1877 he took charge of Christ Church in Hartford, Connecticut. Later, between 1887 and 1890 he was rector of St James’ Church in Philadelphia. He was also professor Church History at Berkeley Divinity School from 1885 to 1887.

He married Clara Quintard on May 18, 1876.

Episcopacy
Nichols was elected Assistant Bishop of Ohio on June 13, 1888, however he declined the election. He was then elected Coadjutor Bishop of California on February 6, 1890 during a special diocesan convention, and was consecrated on June 24, 1890 by Presiding Bishop John Williams at St James’ Church in Philadelphia. He succeeded as diocesan bishop on April 7, 1893 upon the death of Bishop Kit. He was instrumental in acting on behalf of the Presiding Bishop in the transfer of the Church of Hawaii to the Episcopal Church in 1902. Nichols died in office at St. Luke's Hospital in San Francisco on June 5, 1924.

See also

 List of Succession of Bishops for the Episcopal Church, USA

References

1849 births
1924 deaths
People from Ulster County, New York
Episcopal bishops of California
Berkeley Divinity School alumni